Banahara is a village in Azamgarh district, Uttar Pradesh. It is situated on the banks of the Tamsa river. The village is near Durvasa.

References

Villages in Azamgarh district